Trident is a civil parish in the City of Bradford in West Yorkshire, England, created in 2009. The population of the civil parish as at the 2011 Census was 20,281.

See also
Listed buildings in Bradford (Trident Parish)

References 

Areas of Bradford
Civil parishes in West Yorkshire